The Rise of the Black Wolf is the second volume of the Grey Griffins series written by American authors Derek Benz and J. S. Lewis and published by Orchard Books, an imprint of Scholastic Inc. This sequel to The Revenge of the Shadow King centers upon the adventures of the Grey Griffins as they visit Max's father in Scotland.

Plot summary

In The Rise of the Black Wolf, Max and his fellow Grey Griffins (Natalia, Harley, and Ernie) set off on another adventure, traveling to Scotland to visit Max's father for the winter holidays.

The four friends explore Lord Sumner's ancient castle and the dark forest that surrounds it.

Once again, the Grey Griffins must do battle with Fireball Pixies, an army of Werewolves, and the Black Witch, Morgan LaFey. But when Lord Sumner, Max's father, disappears, the Grey Griffins must rescue him with the Knights Templar.
Max's father betrays him and tells Max he staged the incident before (Revenge of The Shadow King). Ernie, however, falls into a coma.

External links
Official website of the Grey Griffins Books
Orchard Books, an imprint of Scholastic Inc.

2007 American novels
American fantasy novels
Novels set in Scotland
Collaborative novels
Orchard Books books